The Girl Without an Address) is a 1957 Soviet romantic comedy film directed by Eldar Ryazanov and written by Leonid Lench. It stars Svetlana Karpinskaya and Nikolai Rybnikov.

Plot
Young builder Pasha Gusarov meets on the train a girl of a quarrelsome nature, Katya Ivanova. At the beginning, their relationship does not go well, but by the end of the trip they become attached to each other. Nevertheless, fate makes its own adjustments. Coming out of the carriage through different doors, they do not meet at the station in Moscow. The only thing that Pasha hears from Katya, as she is going away on a bus, is the beginning of her street name. Pasha and his friend Mitya start searching for the girl in Russia's capital.

Cast
Svetlana Karpinskaya as Katya Ivanova
Nikolai Rybnikov as Pashka Gusarov
Erast Garin as Grandfather
Vasili Toporkov as Cloakroom attendant
Yuri Belov as Mitya
Svetlana Shcherbak as Olya
Zoya Fyodorova as Komarinskaya
Sergey Filippov as Komarinsky
Rina Zelyonaya as Yelizaveta Timofeyevna
Pavel Tarasov as Commandant
Svetlana Kharitonova as Klava
Olga Aroseva as Neighbour
Georgiy Georgiu as Tenant
Georgi Tusuzov as Feoktistych
Lidiya Korolyova as Yekaterina Ivanova
 Valentina Ananina as Secretary
 Irina Murzaeva as Conductor
 Irina Gubanova as Neighbour
 Mikhail Garkavi as  Actor stuck in the elevator
 Marina Figner as Fashion Designer

References

External links

1957 romantic comedy films
Soviet romantic comedy films
Russian romantic comedy films
Films directed by Eldar Ryazanov